The Massachusetts Library Association (MLA) is the Massachusetts, United States professional library association that "advocates for libraries, librarians, and library staff, defends intellectual freedom, and provides a forum for leadership, communication, professional development, and networking to keep libraries vital." MLA publishes standards for library services to Massachusetts children and young adults. MLA sponsors an annual conference, as well as continuing education programs and organizational reports of interest. The current President of MLA is Esme Green, Director of the Goodnow Library in Sudbury.

History 
MLA was founded in 1890 as the "Massachusetts Library Club". The gavel that has been passed down from president to president is said to be made from the wood of the USS Constitution. The MLA had a committee called The Art Club that created sets of photographs for travelling art exhibits that would rotate through Massachusetts member and associate libraries as early as 1900.

In 1962 MLA's Intellectual Freedom Committee gave testimony before the Massachusetts Obscene Literature Control Commission opposing the suppression of Henry Miller's book Tropic of Cancer supporting Massachusetts residents' freedom to read.

Publications
MLA has acted as both a publisher of authors such as Robert Frost as well as an author on many state standards for library services to different populations.
 Books We Like: Sixty-two Answers to the Question...
 Standards for Public Library Services to Children in Massachusetts
 Standards for Public Library Services to Young Adults in Massachusetts
 Bay State Libraries, the MLA newsletter published quarterly (January, April, July, and October), focuses on items of interest to the association and to Massachusetts librarians in general.
 The MLA has developed a Library Use Value Calculator spreadsheet, which is used by many libraries throughout the United States.

Committees 
 Conference Committee
 Intellectual Freedom and Social Responsibilities Committee
 Jordan Miller Committee (annual storytelling program)
 Leadership and Management Section
 Legislative Committee
 Library Information Technologies Section
 Membership Committee
 Personnel & Education Committee
 Public Relations Committee

Sections 
 Technical Services Section
 Paralibrarian Section
 Youth Services Section

Affiliated organizations 
 Massachusetts Friends of Libraries (MFOL)
 Massachusetts Library Trustees Association
 The Massachusetts Board of Library Commissioners (MBLC)
 Massachusetts School Library Association (MSLA)
 American Library Association (ALA) (See also: Wikipedia article on the American Library Association)
 New England Library Association (NELA)
 Association of College and Research Libraries (ACRL)

References

External links
 Massachusetts Library Association (MLA)
 New England Library Association website

Library consortia in Massachusetts
Library Association
1890 establishments in Massachusetts